Theotokos of Pochayiv is an Eastern Orthodox icon of the Virgin Mary, painted in a late Byzantine style, of the Eleusa iconographic type. Like many famous icons, it is now usually displayed with most of the surface covered by an elaborate frame in precious metals, or riza, except for the faces. 

The icon is venerated equally by Eastern Orthodox and Catholics.

The origin of the icon is not clear. It is painted in old Byzantine manner, hence it could be made in either Byzantium or Bulgaria.  

It has been in the Pochayiv Lavra (monastery), in  Ternopil oblast, Ukraine, since 1597, when it was given by a wealthy widow Anna or Hanna Hoyska, who owned the town of Pochayiv in second half of the 16th century. Anna had received the sacred image from the Greek metropolitan Neophyte.

In 1773, Pope Clement XIV, meeting the request of the count Nicolas Potocki sent two small golden crowns for the icon - one for the Holy Virgin, the other for Jesus. Thus the icon was acknowledged as wonder-making.  

According to some sources, the Virgin Mary depicted on the icon helped to heal Philip, the brother of Hanna Hoyska, from blindness. Later, the Theotokos of Pochayiv acquired a reputation as a miracle-working icon. The day of the Theotokos of Pochayiv icon is marked by Orthodox communities on 5 August.

References

Pochayiv
Pope Clement XIV
Ukrainian icons